USS Santa Fe was a  light cruiser of the United States Navy, which were built during World War II. The class was designed as a development of the earlier s, the size of which had been limited by the First London Naval Treaty. The start of the war led to the dissolution of the treaty system, but the dramatic need for new vessels precluded a new design, so the Clevelands used the same hull as their predecessors, but were significantly heavier. The Clevelands carried a main battery of twelve  guns in four three-gun turrets, along with a secondary armament of twelve  dual-purpose guns.

Design

Following the start of World War II in September 1939, Britain announced it would suspend the treaty for the duration of the conflict, a decision the US Navy quickly followed. Though still neutral, the United States recognized that war was likely and the urgent need for additional ships ruled out an entirely new design, so the Clevelands were a close development of the earlier s, the chief difference being the substitution of a two-gun  dual-purpose gun mount for one of the main battery  gun turrets.

The ship was powered by four General Electric steam turbines, each driving one propeller shaft, using steam provided by four oil-fired Babcock & Wilcox boilers. Her crew numbered 1285 officers and enlisted men.

The ship was armed with a main battery of twelve 6 in /47 caliber Mark 16 guns in four 3-gun turrets on the centerline. Two were placed forward in a superfiring pair; the other two turrets were placed aft of the superstructure in another superfiring pair. The secondary battery consisted of twelve  /38 caliber dual-purpose guns mounted in twin turrets. Two of these were placed on the centerline, one directly behind the forward main turrets and the other just forward of the aft turrets. Two more were placed abreast of the conning tower and the other pair on either side of the aft superstructure. Anti-aircraft defense consisted of twenty-four Bofors  guns in four quadruple and four double mounts and twenty-one Oerlikon  guns in single mounts.

The main battery turrets were protected with  faces and  sides and tops, and they were supported by barbettes 6 inches thick. Santa Fes conning tower had 5-inch sides.

Service history

Santa Fe was laid down at the New York Shipbuilding Co. at Camden, New Jersey, on 7 June 1941. She was launched of 10 June 1942, and after completing fitting out, she was commissioned on 24 November. Captain Russell S. Berkey served as the ship's first commanding officer. She thereafter conducted her shakedown cruise and initial training off the East Coast of the United States into early 1943, before sailing for the Pacific Ocean, where she joined the forces engaged in the Pacific Theater of World War II. She arrived in Pearl Harbor, Hawaii, on 22 March and proceeded from there to the Aleutian Islands. She arrived in Alaskan waters on 20 April, and six days later she took part in a bombardment of Japanese-held Attu Island. She participated in patrols off the Aleutians for the next four months during the Aleutian Islands campaign, and she shelled Kiska on 6 and 22 July before American forces landed on the island the following month. She provided gunfire support to the forces that went ashore there on 15 August. Ten days later, Santa Fe left the area and arrived back in Pearl Harbor on 1 September.

Gilbert and Marshall Islands campaign

The ship next joined Cruiser Division 13, which was attached to support the Fast Carrier Task Force. She joined a raid by the fleet's aircraft carriers on Tarawa on 18–19 September and then an attack on Wake Island on 5–6 October. Santa Fe also bombarded Wake and disabled Japanese coastal artillery batteries. On 21 October, she got underway with the Fast Carrier Task Force, but while en route, Santa Fe was detached to cover troop ships sailing for Bougainville. They arrived there on 7 November; Santa Fe remained there to protect the transports as they unloaded their cargoes. She helped to defend the vessels during heavy Japanese air attacks over the next two days before departing for Espiritu Santo. On 14 November, she sortied as part of the escort for the invasion fleet for the Gilbert and Marshall Islands campaign. Santa Fe shelled Tarawa from 20 to 22 November, during the Battle of Tarawa. She left on 26 November to rejoin the Fast Carrier Task Force, which began the next phase of the campaign with air strikes on Kwajalein on 4 December. The fleet returned to Pearl Harbor on 9 December.

In late 1943, Santa Fe arrived back in the United States to begin preparations to join the Gilbert and Marshall Islands campaign. She took part in amphibious assault exercises off San Pedro, California, in January 1944, and on 13 January, she got underway with the invasion fleet. Santa Fe and several other vessels sailed ahead of the fleet to bombard Wotje Atoll on 30 January to prepare for the invasion of Kwajalein, which was to take place the following day. The ship then returned to the invasion fleet to support the marines as they went ashore on Kwajalein. The ship remained offshore through 1 February to bombard Japanese forces as the Americans fought their way across the island, before departing for Majuro, arriving there on 7 February.

On 12 February, Santa Fe sortied as part of the escort for the Fast Carrier Task Force, which raided Truk on 16–17 February and then Saipan on 22 February. The ships then passed back through Majuro for Espiritu Santo, where they replenished for the next major operation. On 30 March and 1 April, she covered the carriers while they struck Japanese positions on Palau, Yap, and Woleai. By 13 April, she had transferred to a task group centered on the carrier , which was sent to western New Guinea to support Allied ground operations there, including the Battle of Hollandia. The group raided Wakde and Sawar on 21 April, including a bombardment by Santa Fe and other elements of the carrier screen. On 28 April, the task group was sent north to raid Truk, Satawan, and Pohnpei from 29 April to 1 May. Three days later, they arrived back in Kwajalein.

Mariana and Palau Islands campaign

Santa Fe next joined a task group led by the carrier , which sortied in June to begin the Mariana and Palau Islands campaign. These began with a series of air strikes on Saipan, Tinian, and Guam from 11 to 16 June during the initial operation, the invasion of Saipan. The American offensive prompted a major response by Japan's fleet, which led to the Battle of the Philippine Sea. Japanese carrier aircraft struck first, on the morning of 19 June, and Santa Fe contributed her anti-aircraft fire to driving off the attackers. American ships and aircraft inflicted serious losses on Japanese carrier aircraft, and the next day, American carrier planes struck the withdrawing Japanese fleet late in the day. To help guide the returning planes in the darkness, Santa Fe used her searchlights, despite the risk of illuminating herself to Japanese submarines that might be in the area. Bunker Hill joined air strikes on Pagan Island on 24 June, after which the task group returned to Eniwetok three days later to rearm and refuel.

On 30 June, Santa Fe got underway again, this time again accompanying Hornet. The carriers struck Iwo Jima, and Santa Fe and other warships bombarded the island on 4 July. The ships then turned back south to resume attacks in the Marianas, and from 6 to 21 July, they attacked Japanese airfields between Guam and Rota to prevent them from interfering with the planned invasion of Guam. The carriers then struck the islands of Yap and Ulithi before returning to Saipan, which had since been seized by American forces. Later that day, the task force sortied again for another attack on Iwo Jima. Two days later, Santa Fe and other vessels encountered a Japanese convoy escorted by the destroyer ; they sank Matsu and several transports of the convoy. The next day, the ships bombarded Iwo Jima again. They then sailed for Eniwetok, arriving there on 11 July. There, Santa Fe transferred to a task group centered on the carrier . They next sortied to carry out strikes on Peleliu from 6 to 8 September, in preparation for the invasion of Peleliu scheduled for the following week. The carriers then shifted to targets in Mindanao in the southern Philippines on 9 and 10 September to prevent them from interfering with the Peleliu operation. Santa Fe and other cruisers intercepted another Japanese convoy on 9 September and sank several vessels. The carriers raided Japanese positions in the area from 12 to 14 September and again from 21 to 24 September, before withdrawing to the Kossol Roads in the Palau islands to replenish.

Philippines campaign

As the American fleet began preparations for the Philippines campaign, the Fast Carrier Task Force carried out a series of strikes on Japanese airfields on Okinawa and Formosa from 10 to 13 October. Four days later, Santa Fe arrived back with the carriers to cover them during the invasion of Leyte.

Santa Fes task group then moved on to launch air strikes on Japanese airfields in the Visayas on 21 October. The next day, they withdrew to refuel before searching for Japanese naval forces that were reportedly in the area over 23 and 24 October. Later on the 24th, Japanese aircraft launched a major attack on the fleet that was defeated, and that evening, the Japanese carriers of the Northern Force were detected. The American fleet turned north to intercept them, and early the next morning, a force of six fast battleships and seven cruisers—including Santa Fe—were detached to pursue the Japanese carriers to try to catch them in a surface action. The American carriers also launched air strikes against the Northern Force, but later that day, reports of the battleships and cruisers of the Center Force attacking the invasion fleet prompted the Americans to detach most of their surface forces to try to block the Japanese battleships. Santa Fe and three other cruisers remained with the Fast Carrier Task Force to sink damaged vessels of the Northern Force, which included the carrier  and the destroyer . The carrier task groups re-formed the next day and sailed for Ulithi, arriving there on 30 October.

Santa Fes task group sailed on 1 November, bound for Manus, where the ships were to undergo maintenance. The ships were quickly recalled after reports of Japanese warships off Leyte, though this proved to be false. The American fleet and forces ashore came under heavy air attack, however, so the task group was kept in the area to help defend American units. The task group's carriers launched retaliatory air strikes on Manila, the capital of the Philippines, on 5 and 6 November, followed by another round of strikes on other targets from 11 to 14 November. Three days later, the ships returned to Ulithi for replenishment. On 20 November, Japanese midget submarines entered the anchorage and sank the oiler . Santa Fe sent her floatplanes to pick up survivors from the sinking.

On 22 November, the task group sortied once again for attacks on Japanese positions in the Philippines, which began three days later. They remained in action off the Philippines until 1 December, when they departed for another period of rest and replenishment at Ulithi. By mid-month, they had joined the forces supporting the landing on Mindoro. On 18 and 19 December, Typhoon Cobra struck the fleet, sinking three destroyers. Santa Fe and other vessels searched for survivors before returning to Ulithi on 24 December. They remained there until 30 December, when the task group got underway to carry out a raid of Japanese airfields on Okinawa and Formosa on 3 and 4 January 1945. On 6 January, they turned south to strike targets on Luzon in the Philippines in preparation for the planned invasion of Lingayen Gulf. Attacks on Japanese airfields in the region continued through 9 January, after which the Fast Carrier Task Force sailed south to launch the South China Sea raid. On 21 January, strikes on Formosa resumed, followed by more attacks on Okinawa the following day. The fleet returned to Ulithi on 26 January to replenish.

Iwo Jima and Okinawa campaigns

Santa Fe was detached from the carriers on 18 February, and bombarded Iwo Jima between 19 and 21 February, silencing Japanese gun batteries on Mount Suribachi and firing illumination missions at night. She rejoined the carriers for another raid on Tokyo on 25 February and then retired to Ulithi on 1 March.

On 14 March, the cruiser joined the  group, which launched strikes on Kyūshū on 18 March and on Japanese fleet units at Kure and Kobe on 19 March. Just as the first strikes were being launched on 19 March, a single Japanese plane dropped two bombs into a cluster of planes on s deck, setting off immense explosions and fires. Santa Fe and her sister ships Mobile and Biloxi maneuvered alongside the carrier, and despite a hail of exploding ammunition, rescued survivors and fought fires. After the cruiser had been alongside for nearly three hours, 833 survivors had been rescued, the major fires were under control, and cruiser  was ready to tow the carrier. Santa Fe escorted the carrier to Ulithi; and, needing repairs herself, left Ulithi on 27 March for a trip back to the United States, escorting Franklin as far as Pearl Harbor. She received a Navy Unit Commendation for her part in the salvage of Franklin, her commander Captain Harold C. Fitz was awarded the Navy Cross and three of her sailors were awarded Silver Stars for risking their own lives to rescue Franklin crewmen from the water.

Overhaul at San Pedro lasted from 10 April to 14 July. The cruiser returned to Pearl Harbor on 1 August and sailed from there on 12 August with carrier  and cruiser Birmingham to attack Wake Island. The raid was canceled when Japan capitulated on 15 August, and the ships were diverted, first to Eniwetok and then to Okinawa, anchoring in Buckner Bay on 26 August, Santa Fe arrived in Sasebo on 20 September and, from 17 October to 10 November, assisted in the occupation of northern Honshū and Hokkaidō. She reported for "Magic Carpet" duty on 10 November and made two trips bringing troops home from Saipan, Guam, and Truk before arriving on 25 January 1946 at Bremerton, Washington.

Santa Fe received 13 battle stars for her World War II service.

Santa Fe was decommissioned on 29 October 1946 and attached to the Bremerton Group, US Pacific Reserve Fleet. She was struck from the Naval Vessel Register on 1 March 1959 and sold on 9 November to Zidell Explorations, Inc., for scrapping.

Footnotes

Notes

Citations

References

External links

 

Cleveland-class cruisers
World War II cruisers of the United States
Ships built by New York Shipbuilding Corporation
1942 ships
Ships of the Aleutian Islands campaign
Pacific Reserve Fleet, Bremerton Group